Leccese may refer to:
 Leccese, a breed of domestic sheep indigenous to the Salento peninsula, in Puglia, Italy

 Franco Leccese (1925-1995), Italian sprinter
 Luciano Gabriel Leccese (born 1982), Argentine professional footballer 

 Muro Leccese, a town and comune in the Province of Lecce, 
 Prince of Muro Leccese, Italian noble title created in 1619 by the Spanish crown for the Barons of Badolato and Belmonte